The Appalachian State Mountaineers football team competes as part of the National Collegiate Athletic Association (NCAA) Division I Football Bowl Subdivision (FBS), representing Appalachian State University in the East Division of the Sun Belt Conference. The team's current head coach is Shawn Clark, who was hired after the departure of Eliah Drinkwitz following the team's victory in the 2019 Sun Belt Championship game.

The Mountaineers fielded their first team in 1928 under coach Graydon Eggers. From 1928 to 1969, Appalachian State participated in the National Association of Intercollegiate Athletics (NAIA) and spent time playing in the North State Conference/Carolinas Conference, the Smoky Mountain Conference, and as an independent. The Mountaineers transitioned to NCAA Division I in 1971, joining the Southern Conference in 1972. Appalachian State, along with the rest of the Southern Conference, began competing at the I-AA (later known as the Football Championship Subdivision, or FCS) level in 1981. The Mountaineers transitioned to the FBS in 2014, joining the Sun Belt Conference alongside longtime Southern Conference rival Georgia Southern.

The Mountaineers have played 89 seasons of football, compiling a record of 616–337–28 and winning 21 conference championships (6 in the North Star Conference, 12 in the Southern Conference, and 3 in the Sun Belt Conference). The Mountaineers appeared in 9 bowl games during their time in the NAIA, compiling a 3–6 record, and they appeared in the FCS playoffs 20 times, winning three national championships (2005, 2006, and 2007). In their five seasons since joining the FBS in 2014, the Mountaineers have recorded a record of 48–16, five consecutive winning seasons, four consecutive bowl wins, and three straight conference titles.

In 1931 the Mountaineers joined the North State Conference and finished in first place under coach C. B. Johnson. Kidd Brewer took over coaching duties of the Mountaineers from 1935 to 1938, winning another North State Conference championship. An All-American at Duke, Brewer's 1937 squad is best remembered for going unbeaten and unscored upon during the regular season, outscoring opponents 206–0 before losing a postseason game to the Southern Miss Golden Eagles 7–0. In 1967, Appalachian State became an independent team for four years. Jim Brakefield was hired as head coach in 1971, vacating the same position he held at Wofford. A year later, in 1972, Appalachian State accepted an invitation into the Southern Conference. Credited as overseeing the transition into Division I football, Brakefield had his most successful season in 1975, guiding the Mountaineers to an 8–3 record with wins over East Carolina, Wake Forest, and South Carolina.

Appalachian State won two Southern Conference championships in 1986 and 1987 under Sparky Woods. After Woods left to coach South Carolina, Jerry Moore was hired to replace him. Moore went on to become the longest-tenured and winningest coach in team history; the Mountaineers recorded a losing season only once in Moore's 24 seasons as head coach. The Mountaineers recorded a record of 215–87–23 during Moore's venture, making 19 playoff appearances and winning 10 Southern Conference championships. The Mountaineers won three consecutive FCS national championships from 2005 to 2007, becoming the first FCS program to ever win three straight titles and the first team from North Carolina to win a football national championship at any NCAA division level. In addition to winning a national championship in 2007, the Mountaineers recorded one of the biggest upsets in United States sports history when they defeated the fifth-ranked Michigan Wolverines 34–32. The win helped Appalachian State become the first FCS team to ever receive votes in the final Associated Press (AP) college football poll on January 8, 2008.

Following Moore's departure in 2012, the Mountaineers hired Scott Satterfield as head coach. After finishing 4–8 in 2013, their first losing season since 1993 and only 5th since 1980, the Mountaineers began play in the FBS. The Mountaineers have since recorded the most successful FBS transition in NCAA history; they have recorded eight consecutive winning seasons, five consecutive bowl wins (from 2015-2020), and four consecutive Sun Belt Championships (from 2016-2019), and have won the East Division 3 times over a four year span (2018-2021). In 2019, after the Conference Championship game but before the New Orleans Bowl, Satterfield left Appalachian State to take the Head Coaching position at Louisville. Satterfield was replaced the following season by Eli Drinkwitz, who left before the 2019 bowl season. Appalachian State coach and Alumni Shawn Clark was hired on December 13, 2019, in time for the 2019 New Orleans Bowl, and is still the coach of the Mountaineers.

Seasons

NAIA (1928–1969)

NCAA Division I/I-A (1971–1981)

NCAA Division I-AA/FCS (1982–2013)

NCAA Division I-FBS (2014–present)

See also

 History of Appalachian State Mountaineers football

Notes

Footnotes

References

Appalachian State Mountaineers

Appalachian State Mountaineers football seasons

de:Appalachian State University
es:Appalachian State Mountaineers